= Marc Lamborelle =

Luxembourgish footballer (born 1971)

Personal information
- Date of birth: 13 October 1971 (age 55)
- Position: Midfielder

Senior career*
| Years | Team | Apps | (Gls) |
| 1991–2001 | Jeunesse Esch | | |

International career
| 1995–1997 | Luxembourg | 6 | (0) |
- * Club domestic league appearances and goals

Marc Lamborelle (born 13 October 1971) is a retired Luxembourgish football midfielder.
